Estadio Centenario is a multi-use stadium in Los Mochis, Sinaloa, Mexico.  It is currently used mostly for football matches and is the home stadium for Murciélagos.  The stadium has a capacity of 10,844 people. It was remodeled by Grupo Faharo for Murciélagos de Los Mochis to be played in the Ascenso MX and completed by the season opener aka Grand Re-Opening of the Stadium on July 31, 2015 against Atlante in Week 2 of Torneo Apertura 2015.

Grand Reopening Match

External links
Stadium information

Centenario
Sports venues in Sinaloa
Los Mochis